"Keeping Your Head Up" is a single by English musician Birdy. It was written by Wayne Hector, Steve Mac, and Birdy for her third studio album, Beautiful Lies (2016). The song was released as the album's lead single on 30 December 2015.

Music video
A music video was first released onto Facebook on 28 January 2016 and a day after on YouTube at a total length of three minutes and thirty-six seconds. The video begins with Birdy lying down with her head on a large pillow, peering intently at the camera. The camera gradually gets closer to her eye, then this scene gives way to various scenes of Birdy and other people. Demons and angels appear in her way throughout the video. At the end, Birdy is again shown lying down with her head on the pillow. The video was directed by Chris Turner (Favourite Color Black).

In popular culture 
The song is featured in the international trailer for the 2019 film Last Christmas.

Charts

Weekly charts

Year-end charts

Certifications

Release history

External links
 Keeping Your Head Up (Official) at YouTube
 Keeping Your Head Up (Live) at YouTube

References

2016 singles
2012 songs
Birdy (singer) songs
Songs written by Steve Mac
Songs written by Wayne Hector
Atlantic Records singles
Songs written by Birdy (singer)
Song recordings produced by Steve Mac